Stephanie Rose McGovern  (born 31 May 1982) is an English journalist and television presenter. She currently hosts Steph's Packed Lunch on Channel 4. She worked for the BBC as the main business presenter for BBC Breakfast, often co-hosting the entire programme.

Early life
McGovern was born in 1982 in North Shields, Tyne and Wear, and grew up in Middlesbrough, North Yorkshire. Her father is professional artist Eamonn McGovern. In 1998, at the start of her sixth form studies, she won an Arkwright Engineering Scholarship for her potential to be a future leader in the engineering industry. From 1998 to 2000, at Macmillan Academy, in the sixth form, she studied maths, physics, design technology and business studies. 

At the age of 19, she was awarded the Young Engineers Clubs' "Young Engineer for Britain", and during a gap year Year in Industry before a then-planned mechanical engineering degree at Imperial College, McGovern was a junior member of Black & Decker’s Six Sigma team in Spennymoor, saving Black & Decker £150,000 a year by improving production techniques used for the Leaf Hog (Blower/Vacuum/Mulcher) later receiving EEF/Year in Industry Award for Contribution to the Business.

She attended University College London, where, in 2005, she received a BSc in science communication and policy in the Department of Science and Technology Studies. In 2013, she was awarded an honorary doctorate by Teesside University.

Career
McGovern started at the BBC doing work experience on the Tomorrow's World programme, before securing part-time employment as a researcher in current affairs. She became the main producer for daily financial news on the Today programme on Radio 4, before becoming the lead producer of business news on the BBC's One, Six and Ten O'Clock news bulletins, working with the then business editor, Robert Peston.

McGovern has presented BBC Radio 5 Live's Wake Up to Money and On the Money and was BBC Breakfasts main business presenter beginning in 2010, as well as a regular presenter of the entire show. She presented Pocket Money Pitch for CBBC. 

Since March 2016, she has co-presented the consumer series Shop Well for Less with Alex Jones for BBC One. In 2018, McGovern presented a six-part BBC series called Made in Great Britain.

McGovern joined the BBC Watchdog presenting team from autumn 2016. She also co-presented Can Britain Have a Pay Rise? for BBC Two alongside James O'Brien and has been both a panellist and host on Have I Got News for You.

In October 2018, McGovern stated that she found Donald Trump "creepy" after he referred to her as "beautiful" during an interview in 2012. She is said to have brushed off Trump's comments by telling him she had heard "better lines" in Middlesbrough's Club Bongo.

McGovern left BBC Breakfast in October 2019 to join Channel 4. She had been expected to host Steph's Talks from spring 2020 at Channel 4's then-new base in Leeds, however the COVID-19 pandemic meant that she began presenting The Steph Show from her front room on 30 March 2020. The show eventually launched in September 2020 as Steph's Packed Lunch.

In 2021, she was elected as an Honorary Fellow of the Royal Academy of Engineering, recognised as a "tireless champion for engineering and vocational skills".

In December 2021, McGovern was featured in the BBC Four series Walking with..., walking in Littondale in the Yorkshire Dales.

McGovern was a contestant in the second series of The Masked Dancer under the stage name 'Tomato Sauce'.  Her first appearance was on 10 September 2022 (Episode 2) and she was voted off on 1 October 2022 (Episode 5). She also hosts industrial events.

Personal life
McGovern is a former champion Irish dancer and still often attends international competitions, where she helps to coach dancers. She confirmed on 14 July 2019 that she was pregnant, she and her girlfriend were expecting their first child. On 4 November 2019, McGovern announced that she had given birth to a baby girl. She lives in Harrogate, North Yorkshire.

References

External links
 Steph's Packed Lunch on Channel 4
 Steph McGovern TV Newsroom
 
 

Living people
Alumni of University College London
Female Fellows of the Royal Academy of Engineering
BBC newsreaders and journalists
BBC Radio 5 Live presenters
British business and financial journalists
People from Middlesbrough
English LGBT journalists
1982 births